Strike Fleet is a 1988 video game developed by Lucasfilm Games and published by Electronic Arts.  It was released for the Amiga, Apple II, Atari ST, Commodore 64, and MS-DOS.  Strike Fleet is the unofficial sequel to the war game PHM: Pegasus.

The player controls either the American or British Fleets over the course of ten scenarios, of which the last four can be played as a single campaign.  The player must fight against the navy and air force of various other nations including Argentina, the Soviet Union, and Iran.

Scenarios

1. Stark Realities
The player's American frigate is on a routine patrol in the Persian Gulf, defending itself and all neutral shipping in the Gulf.

2. The Enemy Below
On May 1, 1982, two British frigates were providing ASW coverage for their forces near Port Stanley on the Falkland Islands, when they detected, and were fired upon, by the Argentine sub . Neither side acknowledged a hit that day. This mission is to search for, and destroy, Argentine submarines that may be in the area.

3. The Road to Kuwait
The captain must escort three tankers through the Persian Gulf.

4. Falklands Defense
During the Falklands War, the captain must engage and destroy three Argentine frigates.

5. Dire Straits
The ship must defend a small convoy of empty oil tankers in the Persian Gulf against speedboats armed with guns and grenades.

6. Atlantic Cork
In a World War III scenario, the captain must prevent the Soviet fleet in the Norwegian Sea from travelling through the GIUK gap, sinking enough ships and subs to seriously cripple their forces.

7. Surprise Invasion
The captain commands as small task force that is trying to prevent a Soviet invasion fleet from reaching Trondheim, Norway.

8. Escape to New York
The captain must make a fast transit to the U.S. east coast, avoiding or defeating Soviet subs, cruisers, and bombers.

9. Wolfpack
The captain must escort a convoy of reinforcements to a U.S. base in Iceland.

10. Mopping Up
The captain must prevent Soviet ships and submarines from returning to their bases to refuel.

Bonus scenarios
The PC version of the game included two bonus missions

11. Bunker Hill Blues
The captain must defend the ship from attacking forces.

12. One for the Gipper
The captain must destroy two oil platforms and one frigate while remaining undamaged.

Reception
In the April 1988 edition of Computer Gaming World, Evan Brooks  thought Strike Fleet had improved upon its predecessor PHM: Pegasus due to the added excitement and variety, while still maintaining quality graphics and historical accuracy. Brooks questioned some decisions regarding the user interface for the bridge and weapons systems. He concluded by giving the game an average rating of three and a half stars out of five.

In the June 1988 edition of Dragon (Issue #134), Hartley, Patricia, and Kirk Lesser were enthusiastic about Strike Fleet, saying it was "a software program you must consider for purchase. The scope of this naval warfare simulation is staggering, and the graphics are absolutely top notch." The Lessers lauded the user's guide for its abundant information, and felt the ten included scenarios offered "hours of intense excitement." They gave the game a perfect rating of five out of five stars, and concluded with a strong recommendation: "We cannot speak highly enough of this
offering. LucasFilm is to be heartily congratulated for developing a tactical game that is completely engrossing, thoroughly exciting, graphically pleasing, and capable of portraying what it must be like to command a Strike Fleet."

In the July 1988 edition of Compute!, Ervin Bobo thought the documentation was "very good, not only teaching you how to use the program, but also in giving you an almost military grounding in the capabilities of your ships and the weapons they carry." Bobo also liked the graphics, calling them, "always good without being cluttered." He concluded with a good recommendation, saying, "Although the notion of commanding a fleet of ships may seem daunting, it can be done. Really." 

In a retrospective article in the January 1994 edition of Computer Gaming World (Issue 114), Evan Brooks maintained his previous rating of 3.5 stars out of 5 from his 1988 review, saying, "Good graphics and game play do much to overcome certain historical innaccuracies... but switching from bridge-to-bridge to effect changes can be an awkward experience."

Reviews
 Casus Belli #46 (Aug 1988)

References

External links

Strike Fleet at the Hall of Light

1988 video games
Amiga games
Apple II games
Atari ST games
Cold War video games
Commodore 64 games
DOS games
LucasArts games
Naval video games
Video games developed in the United States